Snobs is an Australian children's television series that aired from 29 September to 11 November 2003 on the Nine Network.

The series is set in Eden Beach, a fictional suburb of Sydney in its northern beaches district; and follows the story of a community of travellers known as "The Ferals" who decide to set up camp in the suburb, despite protest and anger from residents.

Cast 
 Indiana Evans as Abby Oakley
 Ross Perrelli as Marian Freeman
 Ella Roberts as Pia Freeman
 Mathew Waters as Spike Freeman
 Brooke Callaghan as Brooke Bellingham
 Melissa Jaffer as Gwen Walston

Recurring 
 Kerry Walker as Kizzy Freeman
 Craig Elliott as Tobar Freeman
 Vanessa Steele as Rose Freeman
 Nathy Gaffney as Rachel Oakley
 Alex Hughes as Ryan Grainger
 Miles Szanto as Sam Keogh
 Samuel Rosek as Charlie Oakley
 Katherine Merry as Carla Correlli
 Danny Nash as Jim Correlli
 Tim Campbell as Constable Stubbs
 Ann Burbrook as Mrs. Church
 John Derum as Mr. Alexander
 Rhonda Doyle as Clarissa Bellingham
 Trent Sierra as Banjo Freeman
 Matt Nicholls as Rollo
 Anthony Johnson as Freeman

Plot
Abby Oakley (Indiana Evans), a girl from a wealthy middle-class family, and Marian Freeman (Ross Pirelli), a boy from the group of travellers, act as the main protagonists and form a close friendship despite their differences.

They are often joined by Spike Freeman (Mathew Waters) and Pia Freeman (Ella Roberts) and form the main character group in the show. The title of the show comes from the name of the dog featured in the show, owned by Marian, who acts as a constant companion.

Other major characters in the show are Brooke Bellingham (Brooke Callaghan), former best friend to Abby who, disappointed with her friend's choice of social group, tries many deceitful methods of winning her back, despite still wishing they could be best friends.

Ryan Granger (Alex Hughes) and Sam Keogh (Miles Szanto) act as the bully characters. They are residents of Eden Beach who take particular interest in getting the Ferals out of town, and often resort to ridiculous and callous acts to achieve this, almost all of which backfire on them.

Rachel Oakley (Nathy Gaffney) is Abby's mother, who goes to enormous lengths to try to stop Abby seeing Marian, even going as far as threatening to send her to boarding school.

Tobar Freeman (Craig Elliot) is Marian's father, who at the time of moving to Eden Beach is on probation for robbery, a secret kept from Marian until it is revealed to him later in the series by Rachel Oakley.

Abby's grandmother Gwen (Melissa Jaffer) who Abby is sent to live with in the second part of the series after a series of incidents with her parents.

The story culminates in the Ferals leaving Eden Beach after Marian's father comes off probation, with Marian and his mother opting to stay behind when it is revealed he is in fact related to Abby, as Kizzy, the head of the Ferals, is the sister of Gwen. This emerges when Gwen attempts to persuade her family to remain in town so that Banjo, who is deaf, can have a cochlear implant.

References

External links 
 
 Snobs at the National Film and Sound Archive

2003 Australian television series debuts
2003 Australian television series endings
Television series by Endemol Australia
Australian children's television series
Nine Network original programming
Television series about teenagers
Television shows set in Sydney